Eleanor Gates 'Ellie' Kinnaird (born November 14, 1931) is a North Carolina politician who served as a Democratic member of the North Carolina General Assembly representing the state's 23rd Senate district from January 1997 until her resignation in 2013. Her district included constituents in Orange and Chatham counties.

Career
Kinnaird was mayor of Carrboro, North Carolina from 1987 to 1996; during that time, she also earned a law degree from North Carolina Central University (1992) and entered private practice.  In 1996, she ran for and was elected to the North Carolina State Senate.

At one point, Kinnaird served as Chair of the Appropriations Committee on Justice and Public Safety, as Chair of the Mental Health and Youth Services committee and as Vice-Chair of the Agriculture/Environment/Natural Resources committee. In addition to these leadership positions and her other standing committee assignments on Appropriations/Base Budget, Finance, Health Care and Judiciary I (Civil), she was also a member of the NC Energy Policy Council and the Environmental Review Commission.

Senator Kinnaird is an advocate for electoral reform and lobby reform.  For example, in 2005 she sponsored a bill to require that voting machine source code and election results in North Carolina can be audited; the bill passed the Senate 48-0 and was signed into law in August 2005.

Senator Kinnaird is also an advocate for environmental protection.  She received a 100% rating from the Conservation Council of North Carolina.

A vocal opponent of the death penalty, in 2003 Senator Kinnaird sponsored a bill to initiate a moratorium on the death penalty in North Carolina; the bill passed the Senate 28-22, making the North Carolina Senate the first legislative body in the U.S. South to support a halt to executions.

Elections
In 2007, Kinnaird announced that she was contemplating whether or not to run in the next election, noting that she would like a woman to replace her in the Senate.  She said that due to recent retirements and a dearth of female Senators, the Senate could be left with only three women if she retired, while there were seven women serving as Senators when she first took office.

As of October 2007 only three men (Moses Carey, John Herrera, and Mike Nelson) had announced their intentions to run for the Senate seat possibly being vacated by Kinnaird. Kinnaird announced she would seek re-election in 2008. Both Herrera and Nelson dropped out of the race after Kinnaird's announcement. Carey, however, stayed in and lost to Kinnaird by 64% to 36%.

Kinnaird won re-election in 2010 and in 2012.

References

External links

North Carolina General Assembly – Senator Eleanor Kinnaird official NC Senate website
Project Vote Smart – Senator Eleanor G. 'Ellie' Kinnaird (NC) profile
Inventory of the Ellie Kinnaird Papers
Follow the Money – Ellie Kinnaird
2008 2006 2004 2002 2000 1998 1996 campaign contributions

|-

|-

1931 births
Living people
Politicians from Rochester, Minnesota
American Episcopalians
Democratic Party North Carolina state senators
North Carolina Central University alumni
Women state legislators in North Carolina
Women mayors of places in North Carolina
21st-century American politicians
21st-century American women politicians
People from Carrboro, North Carolina
Carleton College alumni